Nickel Nishal Chand (born 28 July 1995) is a Fijian footballer who plays as a midfielder for Lami in the National Football League.

International career
Chand was selected for the Fiji national under-20 team to compete at the 2015 FIFA U-20 World Cup in May 2015. he played in all three of Fiji's group matches against Germany, Honduras and Uzbekistan.

Chand was also selected by the national under-23 team for the 2015 Pacific Games football tournament and scored a goal in their opening game against Vanuatu.

On May 29, 2016, Chand made his debut for the senior national team at the 2016 OFC Nations Cup in their 3–1 loss against New Zealand.

References

External links

 

Living people
1995 births
Fijian footballers
Suva F.C. players
Labasa F.C. players
2016 OFC Nations Cup players
Footballers at the 2016 Summer Olympics
Fiji international footballers
Olympic footballers of Fiji
Association football midfielders
Fijian people of Indian descent